The Bellevue Formation is a geologic formation in Ohio and Kentucky. It preserves fossils dating back to the Ordovician period.

See also

 List of fossiliferous stratigraphic units in Ohio
 List of fossiliferous stratigraphic units in Kentucky

References
 

Ordovician Kentucky
Ordovician Ohio
Ordovician southern paleotemperate deposits